Paraselliguea is a genus of ferns in the subfamily Drynarioideae of the family Polypodiaceae according to the Pteridophyte Phylogeny Group classification of 2016 (PPG I), with a single species Paraselliguea leucophora.

Taxonomy
The genus Paraselliguea was first erected by Peter Hans Hovenkamp in 2000 for the species Polypodium leucophorum. In the Pteridophyte Phylogeny Group classification of 2016 (PPG I), the genus is placed in the family Polypodiaceae, subfamily Drynarioideae. Other sources place Paraselliguea leucophora in a more broadly circumscribed genus Selliguea as Selliguea leucophora.

References

Polypodiaceae
Monotypic fern genera
Taxa named by John Gilbert Baker